Madeleine Angélique Michelle Drouin, stage names Mademoiselle Préville (1731–1798), was a French stage actress.

She was engaged at the Comédie-Française in 1753. She became a Sociétaires of the Comédie-Française in 1757. She retired in 1786.

She was the sister of Madame Drouin and the spouse of Préville (actor) and played mothers and coquettes with success.

References

External links 
   Mademoiselle Préville, Comédie-Française

1731 births
1798 deaths
18th-century French actresses
French stage actresses